Capel Fell is a hill in the Ettrick Hills range, part of the Southern Uplands of Scotland. Close to the Southern Upland Way, routes of ascent frequently incorporate its track, however the track from Selcoth Fisheries to the west is also popular. It is frequently climbed with the neighbouring hills.

Subsidiary SMC Summits

References

Mountains and hills of the Southern Uplands
Mountains and hills of the Scottish Borders
Mountains and hills of Dumfries and Galloway
Marilyns of Scotland
Donald mountains
Grahams